Aodh Ó Con Ceanainn, (fl. 1319) was king of Uí Díarmata.

Aodh Ó Con Ceanainn was the apparent successor to Donnell, who died at the Second Battle of Athenry in 1316. Aodh is referenced circa 1319, as king of Ui Diarmata.

References
 The Tribes and Customs of Hy-Many, John O'Donovan, 1843
 The Parish of Ballinasloe, Fr. Jerome A. Fahey.
 The Great Book of Irish Genealogies, 239.11, 244.2, pp. 556–557, volume one, Dubhaltach MacFhirbhisigh; edited, with translation and indices by Nollaig Ó Muraíle, 2003–2004. .
 https://www.webcitation.org/query?url=http://www.geocities.com/Athens/Aegean/2444/irish/LD.htm&date=2009-10-25+05:47:51
 Vol. 2 (AD 903–1171): edition and translation
 Annals of Ulster at CELT: Corpus of Electronic Texts at University College Cork
 Annals of Tigernach at CELT: Corpus of Electronic Texts at University College Cork
 Revised edition of McCarthy's synchronisms at Trinity College Dublin.

People from County Galway
14th-century Irish monarchs